Kohram is a 1999 Indian Hindi-language action thriller film directed by Mehul Kumar. It features an ensemble cast of Amitabh Bachchan, Nana Patekar, Jaya Prada, Tabu, Mukul Dev, Mukesh Rishi, Danny Denzongpa, Jackie Shroff, Kabir Bedi and Ayesha Jhulka.

The film is notable for being the only occasion when Bachchan and Patekar clashed onscreen. The film released worldwide on 13th August 1999 to mixed reviews, with praise for the performances of the principal cast, but criticism for the story and screenplay. Commercially the film was an average grosser.

Plot
The story starts with the death of an army officer (Jackie Shroff), and it is believed to be the act of a terrorist group headed by Changezi (Mukesh Rishi). Colonel Balbir Singh Sodhi (Amitabh Bachchan) is asked to investigate this matter and he ends up discovering that minister Veerbhadra Singh (Danny Denzongpa) is involved in this conspiracy. Colonel Sodhi stages his own death in an attempt to kill Changezi and starts living as Dadabhai/ Devraj Hathoda in Mumbai. Major Ajit Arya (Patekar) is sent in the guise of a Bengali journalist to find out the true identity of Dadabhai/Devraj Hathoda. Once Arya discovers the truth, he joins hands with Colonel Sodhi to bring the minister to justice and terminate the terrorist group. Tabu is shown to be a police officer in love with Major Ajit Arya and Jaya Pradha is shown as Colonel Sodhi's wife.

Cast
 Amitabh Bachchan as Colonel Balbir Singh Sodhi/Devraj Hathoda (Dadabhai)
 Nana Patekar as Major Ajit Arya/Basu Bankimchandra Chattopadhyay (BBC)
 Jaya Prada as Namrata B. Sodhi
 Jackie Shroff as Major Rathod(cameo)
 Danny Denzongpa as Minister Virbhadra Singh
 Mukesh Rishi as Ghafoor Changezi
 Tabu as Inspector Kiran Patkar
 Mukul Dev as Monty
 Kabir Bedi as Brig. Bedi
 Ayesha Jhulka as Sweety
 Avtar Gill as Police Commissioner
 Kishori Godbole as Virbhadra Singh's daughter

Songs
Music by the duo Dilip Sen-Sameer Sen.
"Jay Mata Dee He Ambe Baliharee" – Sanjeevani, Sukhwinder Singh
"Palakon Ko Kalam Banaa Ke, To Meraa Naam Nahin" – Alka Yagnik, Hariharan
"Satanaam Vaaheguru, Baabaa Naanak Dukhiyaan De Naath Ve" – Kishanpal Singh
"Janeman Janeman Ladakee Too Number One" – Udit Narayan, Kavita Krishnamurthy
"Pagal Huwa Huwa Huwa" – Shankar Mahadevan, Jaspinder Narula
"Ik Mashuka Hai Yeh Jindagee Tum Ho Isape Shaida" – Sudesh Bhosle, Amit Kumar
"Ladakee Ladakee Too Woh Ladakee" – Alka Yagnik, Abhijeet
"Hum Hai Banaras Ke Bhaya" – Sudesh Bhosle, Amit Kumar

Production
After his film Mrityudata (1997) flopped at the box office, director Mehul Kumar wanted to make another film with Amitabh Bachchan. Both these films were produced by Amitabh Bachchan Corporation. This is when he came up with the idea for Kohram. The original cast announced consisted of Dimple Kapadia, Arshad Warsi and Karisma Kapoor with the working title as "Aye Watan Tere Liye". However, later that was scrapped and this film was made. Initially, Nana Patekar had declined Kumar's offer, but later agreed to do the film. Initially the film was slated to release on 6 August, but then Mehul Kumar advanced it to 13 August.

Release
Initially the film was slated to release on 6 August 1999, but then Mehul Kumar advanced it to 13 August 1999. Kohram grossed  133 million at the box office, while its collections in U.S were $70,257. It performed some good in interiors but couldn't do much and finally declared an average earner.

Critical response 
Kohram received mixed reviews but was received better than Mrityudata, Kumar's previous film. While only 16% users liked it on Rotten Tomatoes, critic Ajay Chaturvedi called it an average film. He said that while the first half is good, the second half is jarringly edited, but the film is a treat for Nana Patekar fans. He also appreciated Tabu's performance in the film. Indolink.com ranked the film 9th in its list of "The Best Bollywood Films of 1999" and wrote, "Though the story isn't all suspense nor substance, the songs aren't record-breaking, the production and camerawork isn't amazing, the film is short enough to keep the audience sitting (less than three hours!), while the acting is excellent enough to keep the audience watching and listening."

References

External links
 

1990s Hindi-language films
1999 films
Films scored by Dilip Sen-Sameer Sen
Films about terrorism in India
Films directed by Mehul Kumar